Lesbianism in Gibraltar became legal in 1992.

Definition 
According to Gibraltar's Equality Rights Group, the word lesbian "is a term used to identify a woman who has an emotional and or sexual orientation towards women. Lesbians have always existed; they are in every culture and part of every economic and social class."

Culture 
The exact number of lesbians in Gibraltar is unknown.  According to accepted scientific and government studies, homosexuality occurs in about 5 to 7% of the population.  Given that, the size of the lesbian and gay population in Gibraltar is likely around 1,700 people.

Discrimination 
Lesbians faced discrimination in Gibraltar society during the 1990s and 2000s. Because of historic discrimination against lesbians and the illegality of homosexuality until 1992, many lesbians in Gibraltar married men to hide their orientation.  The ability to easily hide their orientation was also difficult in earlier periods as a lack of a large housing stock and the small size of Gibraltar meant the multiple generations of the same family often lived together.

Notable lesbians 
Nadine Rodríguez and Alicia Muscat, one of Gibraltar's most visible lesbian couples and most important activists for LGBT rights, became a couple in 1988. In 2017, the couple were presented with the Independent Civil Society award.  They were recognized at a ceremony at the  Gibraltar Garrison Library.

Organizations 
In September 2000, Gibraltarian Felix Alvarez created Gib Gay Rights in response to the lack of movement on homosexual rights following the decriminalizing of male homosexuality in 1993.  After calling a meeting of the newly formed organization, lesbians were among the 21 people to show up and support these efforts.  In September 2005, the group's executive committee included three women, Sandra Poveda, Annette Vallejo, and  Susan Haywood.  In 2019, the organization was dominated by men, with only one woman, Danica Field , on the executive committee.

Legal and political status

Homosexuality 
Gibraltar's laws around homosexuality were first drafted in the Victorian England period.  This period did not believe women had a sexual life or identity separate from men.  Consequently, there was no need for the law to recognize the existence of potential female/female sexual activity and laws about same-sex sexual activity only related to men.

Homosexuality, defined legally as male sodomy, was decriminalized in Gibraltar in 1993 following pressure from the European Court of Human Rights  and Government of the United Kingdom.  Because it related to male sodomy, it did not apply to women.

Age of consent 
In 2008, the law in Gibraltar was discriminatory against lesbians when it came to the age of consent as it was different for same-sex female couples than it was for opposite sex couples.

Political campaigning prior to the 2007 elections was prominent with equality rights organisation Gib Gay Rights (GGR), headed by human rights campaigner Felix Alvarez openly challenging the incumbent Chief Minister, Peter Caruana, for more rights in Gibraltar for gay and lesbian people, and others who are discriminated against. Campaigning on the issue of an equal age of consent of 16 had been strongly undertaken. The issues were raised at the Foreign Affairs Committee enquiry into the overseas territories in 2008, where they concluded:

 We recommend that the Government should take steps to ensure that discrimination on the basis of sexual orientation or gender status is made illegal in all overseas territories.

The influential Gibraltar Women's Association (GWA) has called for the age consent to be leveled at 18. On 1 October 2009, new proposed legislation would enable the Government of Gibraltar to ask the Supreme Court to test whether existing or draft laws are compatible with the Constitution. This would provide a simplified, purpose-built mechanism to deal with contentious issues such as the age of consent.

In March 2010, the Government of Gibraltar sought an opinion from the Court to see if the unequal age of consent was discrimination under the principles of the European Council. On 1 April 2010, Secretary of State for Foreign and Commonwealth Affairs David Miliband pointed out that if a British Overseas Territory is unwilling to meet "international obligations" such as equalising the age of consent it may be imposed by an Order in Council.

On 8 April 2011, the Supreme Court of Gibraltar ruled that a higher age of consent of 18 for gay sex was unconstitutional, and thus mandated an equal age of consent of 16, while at the same time also decriminalising heterosexual anal sex. In August 2011, the gender-neutral Crimes Act 2011 was approved, which sets an equal age of consent of 16 regardless of sexual orientation, and reflects the recent Supreme Court decision in statute law. The law took effect on 23 November 2012.

Shared property and tenant rights 
In late 2008, the lesbian couple of Nadine Rodríguez and Alicia Muscat tried to include each other on a shared rental agreement for an apartment through the Gibraltar Housing Allocation Committee but were denied that ability as same-sex partnerships are not recognized in Gibraltar; lesbian couples could not share legal responsibility in things like renting public apartment, in case something would happen to the other member of the couple.  In December 2008, in the case titled Nadine Rodriguez v. the Minister for House of the Government of Gibraltar & ORS, a local court ruled in their favor of the couple in that they be allowed to share a rental contract but the Government appealed this.  In May 2009, their case appeared before the Supreme Court of Gibraltar who reaffirmed the rights of the couple. When they continued to be denied the ability to share a lease contract, they took the matter to the British courts, London’s Privy Council, to get their ability to share property recognized.  The couple again proved successful in their claims.

Civil unions and legal recognition of relationships 
Same-sex marriage was not legal in Gibraltar in 2008 and 2009 and the colony also did not recognized same-sex partnerships. In 2009,  Equality Rights GGR  requested the government approve legislation that would grant recognition to same-sex couples through civil unions.

In January 2014, the Civil Partnership Bill 2014 was published for community consultation and headed for introduction in the Gibraltar Parliament. On 21 March, the bill was approved by Parliament with no noticeable opposition. The bill was given royal assent on 25 March. The law and related rules and regulations took effect on 28 March.

In March 2014, the Parliament passed a civil partnership law, granting same-sex couples most of the rights of marriage, including allowing the adoption of children by civil partners, as mandated by the court ruling in 2013.   Nadine Rodríguez and Alicia Muscat became the first couple and first lesbian couple in Gibraltar to get a civil union. Chief Minister of Gibraltar Fabian Picardo was present for the ceremony. Rainbow flags were flown along 6 Convent Place in celebration of their union. The couple had their honeymoon in Venice.

Same-sex marriage 
Starting in 2009,  Nadine Rodríguez and Alicia Muscat had been trying to get same-sex marriage legalized in Gibraltar using judicial processes.

Same-sex marriage became an issue of interest for the Government after their re-election in 2015. A command paper to that effect was published in December 2015 and a public consultation was held, whilst talk of a possible referendum on the issue was not ruled out. The leader of the opposition Social Democrats Party announced his support for same-sex marriage in January 2016, days before the Government ruled out a referendum. An inter-ministerial committee was set up in March 2016 to listen to stakeholder concerns and more than 3,400 responses to the discussion were received. The Government published a bill to legalise same-sex marriage in August 2016.

On 26 October 2016, the Civil Marriage Amendment Bill 2016 was passed in the Gibraltar Parliament with unanimous support from all 15 members present during the vote. The bill received royal assent on 1 November and took effect on 15 December 2016. The first legally recognized same-sex marriage in Gibraltar took place the next day.

The GSLP–Liberal Alliance, who were re-elected in 2015, included the following commitment in their election manifesto: "We will now publish a Command Paper in order to take the views of the public on how to best deal with the request by some for civil marriage to be extended to same sex couples. We are totally committed both to ensuring that religious denominations are not forced to change their practices, beliefs or sacraments in any way and to the principle that the State must not discriminate between individuals based on the grounds of sexual orientation. The results of the responses to the Command Paper will be published by June [2016]." The Equal Rights Group said it did not go far enough and asked for more commitment to introduce same-sex marriage.

On 22 December 2015, a command paper on introducing same-sex marriage was published and was under consultation until 15 January 2016. On 4 January 2016, it was announced that the consultation period had been extended to 29 January 2016. On 5 January 2016, a spokesman for the Government stated that a referendum on the issue had not yet been ruled out until all the comments submitted by the public had been considered.

On 18 January 2016, in his New Year message, GSD leader Daniel Feetham declared his support for same-sex marriage and, despite allowing members of his party a free vote on matters of conscience, stated that his parliamentary colleagues all declared their support for the issue as well. He then stated that it was up to the Government to decide on how to proceed with the issue when the time comes.

On 20 January 2016, it was announced by Chief Minister Fabian Picardo (GSLP) that there would be no referendum on same-sex marriage after a parliamentary debate on the issue was initiated by the Opposition. In that same debate, the Chief Minister stated that he expected the feedback from the consultation process to actually improve the bill on same-sex marriage.

On 21 March 2016, the Government announced that it had received 3,490 responses in regards to the public consultation and that, due to the controversial nature of the subject, it would establish an Inter-Ministerial Committee (composed of four members of the Government: Gilbert Licudi, Samantha Sacramento, Neil Costa, and Albert Isola) to listen to the views of the various groups and many of the individuals who expressed a view on the subject, and report its findings back to the Cabinet by June 2016. In response to the Government's announcement, the chairman of the Equality Rights Group (ERG), Felix Alvarez, questioned the commitment of the governing GSLP-Liberal Alliance to legislate on the matter and urged both the LGBT community at large and their friends and supporters to remain calm and reserve their responses until the Government comes up with a definitive answer on how to handle this situation. Based on their own statistics and past advocacy efforts, ERG claimed that over 63% of those consultation responses were in favor of same-sex marriage and that the situation shouldn't be made more complicated than it should be.

On 15 August 2016, a government bill on the legalisation of same-sex marriage was published. On 26 October 2016, the Civil Marriage Amendment Bill 2016 was passed in the Gibraltar Parliament with unanimous support from all 15 members present during the vote. An amendment to remove a controversial part of the bill, which allows deputy registrars to opt out of conducting same-sex marriages was defeated 11 to 4 with only some of the Opposition MPs voting in favor. The bill requires that, in circumstances where a deputy registrar does not agree to officiate a same-sex marriage, an alternative registrar must be assigned to conduct the marriage. The bill received royal assent on 1 November and took effect on 15 December 2016. The first same-sex marriage in Gibraltar was performed the following day.

In May 2017,   Nadine Rodríguez and Alicia Muscat  sought to convert their civil partnership into a marriage were told to divorce first by authorities, who cited a lack of legislation for converting a civil partnership to a marriage. This occurred despite the Gibraltar Equality Rights Group confirming that such a provision existed in the law, and that the matter was simply one of excessive paperwork.

Adoption and family planning 
A long term lesbian couple tried to adopt in Gibraltar but were denied on the basis of the lack of legal recognition of their relationship under Gibraltar adoption laws. The couple had a child together using IVF, where one woman had her fertilized eggs implanted in her partner's uterus.  They then went to court to challenge these laws. On 10 April 2013, the Supreme Court ruled that section 5 (2) of the Adoption Act was in violation of the Gibraltar Constitution thus in effect, de jure legalising LGBT adoption in Gibraltar. The Government announced that they planned to amend the law as soon as possible and that the Care Agency would take appropriate measures to allow same-sex couples to adopt. Gibraltar's Equality Rights Group said after the announcement by the Supreme Court,  "They (the couple) have been brave and determined in their application, despite social pressures, out of love for their child and for each other. [...] GGR will continue to support individuals, regardless of any status, in just human and civil rights claims before the Courts."  Prior to that point, only heterosexual married couples and single people had been eligible to adopt.

In June 2017, the Gibraltar Health Authority approved an amendment to its In Vitro Fertilisation Policy to include female same-sex couples.

Anti-discrimination legislation 
When the Gibraltar constitution was being revised in 2006, sexual orientation was intentionally excluded from the list of specific non-discrimination categories.

The Gibraltar Socialist Labour Party Government, elected in 2011, announced plans to include sexual orientation in the goods and services anti-discrimination law (sexual orientation is already covered in employment anti-discrimination law since 2005). The party renewed this commitment in their manifesto for the 2015 election, in which they were re-elected.

Hate crime legislation 
A bill to amend the Crimes Act 2011, that would criminalise both hatred and harassment on the ground of sexual orientation as a hate crime, was approved by the Gibraltar Parliament on 19 September 2013 and given royal assent on 25 September. The law took effect on 10 October 2013.

References 

History of Gibraltar
LGBT in Gibraltar